The 1983–84 Omani League was the 10th edition of the top football league in Oman. Dhofar S.C.S.C. were the defending champions, having won the previous 1982–83 Omani League season. Fanja SC emerged as the champions of the 1983–84 Omani League.

Teams
This season the league had 14 teams.

Stadia and locations

League table

Top level Omani football league seasons
1983–84 in Omani football
Oman